John Charles (29 September 1935 – 21 June 1995) was  a former Australian rules footballer who played with Fitzroy in the Victorian Football League (VFL).

Notes

External links 		
		
		
		
		
		
	
1935 births		
1995 deaths		
Australian rules footballers from Victoria (Australia)		
Fitzroy Football Club players